is a Japanese football player for Matsue City FC.

Career
After graduating at Hannan University, Taki opted to join Albirex Niigata Singapore FC and play abroad, also featuring in the Montenegrin championship with FK Bokelj. In Summer 2017, he came back to Japan to play for Briobecca Urayasu, just to stay in Japan Football League for 2018 season with ReinMeer Aomori.

In February 2019, Taki joined Matsue City FC.

Club statistics
Updated to 28 August 2018.

References

External links
Profile at ReinMeer Aomori

1992 births
Living people
Association football people from Kyoto Prefecture
Japanese footballers
Singapore Premier League players
Montenegrin First League players
Japan Football League players
Albirex Niigata Singapore FC players
FK Bokelj players
Briobecca Urayasu players
ReinMeer Aomori players
Matsue City FC players
Expatriate footballers in Singapore
Expatriate footballers in Montenegro
Chinese expatriate footballers
Association football forwards